Martyn Frederick Dafydd Lloyd (6 June 1954 – 2 March 2017) was an English cricketer.  Lloyd was a right-handed batsman who bowled right-arm medium pace.  He was born in Headington, Oxfordshire.

Lloyd made his first-class debut for Oxford University against Somerset in 1974.  He appeared in 5 further first-class matches for the University, the last coming against Sussex in 1975.  In his 6 matches, he scored 74 runs at a batting average of 6.72, with a highest score of 36. He did not bowl in first-class cricket.

Lloyd made his debut for Oxfordshire in the 1974 Minor Counties Championship against Wiltshire.  He played Minor counties cricket for Oxfordshire from 1974 to 1977, before playing a handful of games for Dorset in 1981.

References

External links
Martyn Lloyd at ESPNcricinfo
Martyn Lloyd at CricketArchive

1954 births
2017 deaths
Cricketers from Oxford
English cricketers
Oxford University cricketers
Oxfordshire cricketers
Dorset cricketers
Alumni of Magdalen College, Oxford